Wheelchair curling tournaments have been staged at the Paralympic Games since the Winter Paralympic Games in 2006 in Turin.

The tournaments are staged for mixed gender teams.

Canada has been the most successful team in the tournaments, winning three of five gold medals.

Participating nations
The final placement for each team in each tournament is shown in the following tables.

Mixed tournament

Medal table

Medal summary

Mixed team

Tournaments

Mixed team

See also

Curling at the Winter Olympics

References

 

 
Sports at the Winter Paralympics
Paralympics
Paralympics